Škoda 706 RTO-K was a protype of an articulated urban bus produced by bus manufacturer Karosa and Škoda of Czechoslovakia, in the year 1960. It was succeeded by Karosa ŠM 16,5 in 1968.

Construction features 
706 RTO-K is a three-axle bus with rear B axle driven. The front part is almost identical with Škoda 706 RTO buses, also based on the rear of this type, but has been modified. Bus has four two folding doors on the right and additional small door on the left side panel, which led directly to drivers cab. Inside are the seats for passengers arranged in a 2 + 2 layout with central aisle.

Bus 706 RTO-K also had a peculiarity each axle or suspension. The front axle was suspension with leaf springs, using a central axle air suspension, rear axle uses pneumatic suspension with membrane.

Production and operation 
In 1960, a single prototype (the first Czechoslovak articulated bus) was made, but mass production never started. The prototype was tested starting in 1961 at ČSAD Praha, both on suburban routes (e.g. Prague - Horní Počernice) and long distance lines (e.g. Prague - Pec pod Sněžkou). In trial runs with passengers, the prototype proved successful; the only complaints from drivers concerned a weak engine that had problems when the bus was fully occupied. In 1966, the bus was apparently handed over to the enterprise Chirana Brno, which scrapped it in 1969.

After the failure of the production of articulated RTO buses in Czechoslovakia, serial production began in large numbers under a license in Poland (like standard buses Škoda 706 RTO). Buses were produced initially as Jelcz AP 02 (a little longer than 706 RTO-K), then Jelcz AP 021 (a little smaller than 706 RTO-K) was released and produced until 1975.

Replica 
A replica was built in Zlín for a private collector, starting in 2010. In 2013, it was finished and introduced to the public in Prague.

Historical vehicles 
 replica of Škoda 706 RTO-K built from two 706 RTO buses

See also 

 List of buses

Buses
Articulated buses
Buses manufactured by Karosa
Buses of the Czech Republic